The 2022 Serbia EuroBasket team represented Serbia at the EuroBasket 2022 in the Czech Republic, Georgia, Italy, and Germany.

Serbia qualified for the EuroBasket by winning the EuroBasket 2022 qualification Group E. The team is coached by FIBA Hall of Fame coach member Svetislav Pešić, with assistant coaches Oliver Kostić, Marko Marinović, and Saša Kosović.

This will the seventh appearance of Serbia at the EuroBasket as an independent state; its best results are second places in 2009 and 2017.

Background

Timeline 
 12 July 2022: 22-man roster announced
1 August: The players gathering in Crowne Plaza, Belgrade
3 August: Start of a training camp in Stara Pazova, at the FAS House of Football
15 August: The end of the training camp
13–20 August: Exhibition games
 25–28 August: Fourth window of the 2023 FIBA Basketball World Cup qualification
31 August: 12-man roster announcement
1 September: Departure of the team to Prague, Czech Republic
1–18 September: EuroBasket 2022

Roster 

On 10 June 2022, it was announced that an NBA guard Bogdan Bogdanović will miss the EuroBasket due to a right knee surgery. It's the first time that Serbian national team plays without Bogdanović at a major tournament since EuroBasket 2011. On 15 June, center Nikola Jokić, who was named the NBA Most Valuable Player Award for the 2021–22 season, has confirmed that he will play at the EuroBasket.

On 12 July 2022, head coach Svetislav Pešić announced a 22-man preliminary roster for the EuroBasket 2022. The 22-man roster includes three NBA players (Nemanja Bjelica, Aleksej Pokuševski, Jokić); then two All-EuroLeague Team members for the 2021–22 season: guard Vasilije Micić and forward Vladimir Lučić; as well as seven domestic league players. Furthermore, the roster includes three high-profile-leagues MVPs for the 2021–22 season: Jokić (NBA), Micić (EuroLeague Final Four MVP), and Miloš Teodosić (EuroCup Finals MVP).

The initial 22-man roster excluded NBA center Boban Marjanović and EuroLeague guard Danilo Anđušić. On 14 July, guard Anđušić expressed his disappointment on his cut from the 22-man preliminary roster. Marjanović was not included due to an injury. On 3 August, head coach Pešić announced that NBA players Pokuševski and Nikola Jović are cut from the roster due to disapproval of their clubs, the Oklahoma City Thunder and the Miami Heat respectively. On 8 August, two more players were removed from the rooster, veteran guard and team captain Teodosić due to coach's decision and forward Alen Smailagić due to his long prolonged injury. On 15 August 2022, head coach Pešić, following a cut of Teodosić, announced forwards Bjelica and Lučić as co-captains. Following the Bjelica's cut from the roster due to injury, Lučić became sole team captain.

On 1 September, center Nikola Milutinov was reported injured due to health issues, missing a team departure to Prague. On 5 September, he arrived to Prague. On 7 September, following the Game 4, guard Nemanja Nedović was reported injured and out for the rest of the tournament. Two days later, Nedović left to Madrid, Spain, for a therapy on his injury.

The members of Serbia roster at the 2019 Serbia FIBA Basketball World Cup  guards Micić, Marko Gudurić, forward Lučić and centers Jokić and Milutinov are coming back to the EuroBasket roster. Guard Nedović and forward Nikola Kalinić made the first appearance at a major tournament since the 2016 Summer Olympics. Guards Ognjen Jaramaz and Vanja Marinković, forwards Dejan Davidovac and Marko Jagodić-Kuridža, as well as center Dušan Ristić made their debuts at a major tournament. The average age is 29 years old.

The following is the 12-man Serbia roster for the EuroBasket:

Depth chart

Earlier candidates 
The following were candidates to make the team:

Staff 
He was introduced to the FIBA Hall of Fame as coach in 2020.

Age – describes age on 1 September 2022

Source

Uniform

Supplier: Peak
Main sponsor: Triglav
Back sponsor: Raiffeisen Bank (below number)
Shorts sponsor: mts

Exhibition games

On 26 July, it was announced that Serbia will go to play against Slovenia on 17 August in Ljubljana. The match with Montenegro on 13 August in Belgrade was played behind closed doors and it started with a moment of silence for the victims of Cetinje shooting from the day before. On 20 August, Serbia won the 2022 DBB SuperCup following a 83–56 win over Germany.

DBB Supercup Hamburg

2023 FIBA Basketball World Cup qualification, Group I

Tournament 

The EuroBasket 2022 is the 41st edition of the EuroBasket championship that is organized by FIBA Europe. It will be the first since it was agreed it would take place every four years, with a similar system of qualification as for the FIBA Basketball World Cup. It was originally scheduled to take place between 2 and 19 September 2021, but due to the COVID-19 pandemic and the subsequent postponement of the 2020 Summer Olympics to 2021, it has been postponed to 1 to 18 September 2022. Like the previous two editions, the tournament will be co-hosted by four countries. Games in the group stage will be held in the Czech Republic, Georgia, Germany, and Italy. The knock-out phase will be played in Berlin, Germany.

Preliminary round 

The draw took place on 29 April 2021 in Berlin. The top four teams will advance to the knockout stage.

Results by round

All times are local (UTC+2).

Netherlands 
Center Nikola Milutinov was out of the Serbian roster due to health issues.

A Dutch forward Worthy de Jong played one of the best games of his career, getting 28 points for the Netherlands, but Serbia had another gear in them and were unfazed en route to a winning start, a 100–76 victory in front of a large group of their fans in Czech Republic. The main reason for Serbia never losing their composure was the fact they have center Nikola Jokić and guard Vasilije Micić in their ranks. Both stars played outstanding games to safely guide Serbia to a first win ahead of their match-up with the group hosts on Saturday. The Netherlands were a stubborn opponent on Friday night, not giving up for even a second. Their best stretch was in the beginning of the third-quarter, when Worthy de Jong helped them reduce the deficit to 56–51 with five to play in third. However, Jokić and Micić remained calm and created a 14-3 run to get back into double digits. They were on cruise control the rest of the way, even with Oranje coming back to single digit deficit a couple of times. Guard Micić was impressive with a 15-point, 12-assist double-double, while Jokić finished with 19 points, 6 rebounds and 4 assists, sitting out the entire fourth quarter. Serbia were +10 in rebounds, +8 in steals, +10 in assists, -9 in turnovers, +9 in points from turnovers, +10 in fast break points, +17 in second chance points, +24 in points in the paint, +8 in points from the bench. They are just warming up, and that's a scary sight when they scored 100 points in this one. Guard Vanja Marinković had five threes and 18 points, center Dušan Ristić and forward Nikola Kalinić were also in double figures, all 11 players played and all 11 of them scored. Perfect start for Serbian coach Svetislav Pešić, who is still waiting for Nikola Milutinov to join. The Netherlands made Serbia work, and Worthy de Jong scored 28 points in 27 minutes, done on 11-of-14 shooting from the field. Guard Keye van der Vuurst de Vries was the only other man in double digits with 11.

It is the second highest scoring game for Serbia in the EuroBasket history. Guard Micić became the second Serbian player with a 15+ points and 10+ assists game, as well as the 16th Serbian player with a double-double at a major tournament since 1995.

TCL Player of the Game: Nikola Jokić and Vasilije Micić

Czech Republic 
Center Nikola Milutinov was out of the Serbian roster due to health issues, as well as a Czech guard Tomáš Satoranský.

It was always going to be an uphill battle for Czech Republic, and after learning that their captain Tomáš Satoranský would not suit up for the game against Serbia, it got tougher. Svetislav Pešić's men used a dominant second quarter to escape their opposition and secure their 2-0 record. Backed by the crowd in the sold-out arena in Prague, the hosts were holding on in the first quarter, ending it with a five point deficit. However, Serbia's next huddle proved to be the winning one, as head coach Pešić found the panacea for the poison already after 10 minutes. A much more determined Serbian squad came out in the second, and a 15-0 run followed, suddenly making a couple of thousand Serbian fans louder than the Czech majority in the stands. The biggest lead was 23 points in the third quarter. However, the hosts did have one final push to raise the volume in the arena again. The Czechs got back to a single-digit deficit a few times in the last quarter, only to see Vasilije Micić, Nikola Jokić and Vanja Marinković come up with big shots and assists, pushing the lead back to safety. Serbian center Jokić was unstoppable, recording 18 points in 25 minutes of playing time, done on 7-of-11 shooting from the field, with 11 rebounds, 5 assists and 2 steals. Turnovers hurt Czech Republic, as they committed 15 of them, which Serbia turned into an 18–8 advantage in points off turnovers. At the same time, Serbia lost possession only five times in the entire game. It finished 81–68, meaning Serbia sits on top of the group standings or now. Czech Republic are now in a do-or-die situation at 0–2 with three games remaining.

Serbian center Jokić recorded his third double-double at a major tournament, becoming the fourth player since 1995 to do so.

TCL Player of the Game: Nikola Jokić

Finland 
Guard Vanja Marinković was out of the Serbian roster due to stomach issues, while center Nikola Milutinov returns.

Backed by their 5,000 traveling fans and led by their NBA star, Lauri Markkanen, Finland hoped they could make life difficult for Serbia on Monday. The 2017 runners-up however responded with a statement win, 100–70, which lifts them to 3–0 in Group D. Serbia missed only two shots in the first six and a half minutes, dished out 8 assists on 11 field goals and scored 26 points by that point already. Finland made a run to reduce the deficit to 33–22 at the end of the first quarter, but a merciless 11–0 Serbian run made it clear that there will be no upset in Prague. Serbia had 62 at the half, Finland passed that mark only at the 2:07 mark in the fourth quarter. Meaning, Serbia scored more in 20 minutes than Finland in 38. Serbian coach Svetislav Pešić showed a masterful display of out-pacing Finland, matching their intensity by going even harder after them, and balancing out the minutes and roles for all his players. The one who shined the brightest was once again Nikola Jokić, with 13 points, 14 rebounds and 7 assists. Also in double digits: Vasilije Micić (14 points, 7 assists), Nemanja Nedović (14 points), Nikola Kalinić (13 points, 5 assists, 4 rebounds), Vladimir Lučić (12 points) and Marko Gudurić (11 points). Serbia's high percentages were due to their good looks all game long. They got 44 points in the paint, exactly the double of Finland's tally in the key.

TCL Player of the Game: Svetislav Pešić

Israel  
A Serbian guard Vanja Marinković did not suit up for the second game, still recovering from his stomach issues.

Israel put up a fight, came within two points in the fourth quarter, but a quick Serbian 14–0 run put the game out of their reach. Serbia were bothered by Israel's matchup zone, but still able to stay in front for most of the game. Their biggest lead was by 18 points, however Israeli Deni Avdija (also holding Serbian citizenship) decided to make things interesting. With his scoring, passing and elite defense that saw him guard everybody from Serbian guard Vasilije Micić to center Nikola Jokić, Israel went on an inspired run to reduce the gap to 65–63 in the fourth quarter. That only made the Serbian machine switch to a higher speed. A swift 14–0 run wasn't powered by Jokić nor Micić. Serbian guard Ognjen Jaramaz exploded and collected 10 points, guiding Serbia back towards double digit lead, and ultimately to their fourth win in four tries. Jokić had 29 points on 11-of-13 shooting, with 11 rebounds and 5 assists. His defense was also on the highest possible level, 4 steals and 2 blocks got him an efficiency rating of 46, a game-high by some distance and a new tournament high. Serbia had 10 steals, forced 17 turnovers, went +11 in fast break points, more than enough to win this. Serbia once again had Micić in a good mood, 19 points, and forward Nikola Kalinić was also in double figures with 10.

Jokić became the first Serbian with a double-double in three games in a row, as well as the first Serbian player with a 25+ points and 10+ rebounds game at EuroBasket.

TCL Player of the Game: Nikola Jokić

Poland 
Serbian guard Nemanja Nedović is out of the Serbian roster due to injury, while guard Vanja Marinković returns.

Serbia were the clear favorite to win their Group, and they delivered with a perfect record, two wins clear of everyone else. Serbian center Nikola Jokić sat out the fourth quarter, and still was the best player in a 96–69 win over Poland on Thursday that concluded group action. He looked inspired as he collected 19 points on 7-of-8 shooting, done in less than 18 minutes on the floor. Serbia finished the group stage at 5–0, Poland fell to 3–2. Finland, who had the tiebreaker over the Poles take second place in the group and hence coach Igor Miličić and his men drop to third place in the final standings. There were a number of short runs by Serbia that handed them a double digit lead early on, and it kept growing all the way until they got to 52–33 at the break. Poland was trailing by 13 early on in the third quarter, but a timeout by coach Svetislav Pešić resulted in Serbia pulling away decisively for a 25-point lead by the end of the period. Serbia dominated the boxscore, but perhaps the best indicator of their exhibition were the points in the pain, where they oustcored Poland 48–22. Serbia were perfect in Prague and got better with each passing game. Serbian center Nikola Milutinov made his EuroBasket 2022 debut with 16 points on 5-of-7 shooting from the field.

TCL Player of the Game: Nikola Jokić

Knockout stage 

Round of 16  
Serbian guard Nemanja Nedović is out of the Serbian roster due to injury. Serbia won over Italy in an exhibition game at DBB Supercup in Hamburg on 19 August.

Italy pulled off the first upset of the Round of 16 with a 94–86 shock over Serbia to reach the Quarter-Finals. One summer after surprising Serbia in the Final of the 2020 FIBA Olympic Qualifying Tournament in Belgrade to reach the Tokyo Games, Italy worked their team basketball magic again – and doing it without head coach Gianmarco Pozzecco who was ejected in the third quarter. Serbia raced ahead by 11 points in the first quarter and the cushion grew to 14 points in the second quarter. Italy came back and were hanging tough down just 61–57 with under 5 minutes left in the third quarter when Pozzecco left the court in tears after being ejected from the game with a second technical foul. Italy took the lead 66–63 and were down 68–66 after 30 minutes. But Italy opened the fourth quarter with a 16–2 run to lead 82–70. Serbia could not regain the momentum. Italian guard Marco Spissu came up for an incredible second half as the Italian guard poured in 19 of his 22 points in the final 20 minutes. He also finished the game with 6 assists, 4 rebounds and 2 steals. Nikola Jokić's 32 points and 13 rebounds were not enough for Serbia. Italy shot 36.2 percent from three-point range on 32 attempts per game in the Group Phase and then made 16-of-38 for 42.0 percent against Serbia. Italy committed only 7 turnovers and forced Serbia into 16 miscues for an advantage of 16–6 in points off turnovers. Italy held Serbia to 10.0 percent below their field goal shooting and 11.0 percent percent below their two-point shooting.

TCL Player of the Game: Marco Spissu (ITA)

Awards

Statistics

Player statistics

Double-doubles 
 Nikola Jokić – 4
 Vasilije Micić – 1

Statistical leaders
Last updated:

Individual game highs 

Source

Team game highs 

Source

Notes

References

External links

Serbia EuroBasket profile on FIBA
Serbia Newsfeed at B92

Serbia
2020
2022–23 in Serbian basketball